Sharks F.C. is a former Nigerian football club based in Port Harcourt, Rivers State. They played in the top division in Nigerian football, the Nigerian Premier League. Their home stadium was Sharks Stadium although they played some of their bigger games at Liberation Stadium. In 2016, the club was officially merged with city rivals Dolphins F.C. and the two teams became collectively known as Rivers United F.C.

History
Sharks were almost relocated to Abeokuta in 1998 due to crowd problems. In protest, they missed the last six games of the 1998 Professional League, finished bottom of the league on 32 points and were suspended for two years.

2009–10
They started the 2009–10 season slow out of the gate, anchored to the bottom of the table and going through three managers when Kadiri Ikhana left after eight games. On 27 February 2010 they were suspended indefinitely by the league for "noncompliance of statutes" after a shakeup of their management staff. This was after the team was robbed in Edo State on their way back from a minicamp in Abuja. They managed to finish in 16th place with 48 points, avoiding relegation by one point.

Merger with Dolphins
After relegation in 2016, the Government of Rivers State merged the Sharks F.C. with their rivals Dolphins F.C. to create Rivers United F.C. which took Dolphins' slot in the Premier League.

Achievements
West African Club Championship (UFOA Cup)
 Winners (1): 2010

Nigerian FA Cup
Runners-up (3): 1979, 2003, 2009

Notes

External links

 
Association football clubs established in 1972
Football clubs in Port Harcourt
1972 establishments in Nigeria
1970s establishments in Rivers State
Sports clubs in Nigeria
Association football clubs disestablished in 2016
2016 disestablishments in Nigeria
2010s disestablishments in Rivers State
Defunct football clubs in Nigeria